Kleine Isar may refer to two different branches of the river Isar in Bavaria, Germany:
Kleine Isar (Munich), in the town of Munich
Kleine Isar (Landshut), in the town of Landshut